Gibberula sandwicensis is a species of sea snail, a marine gastropod mollusk in the family Marginellidae, the margin snails.

The spelling with the epithet "sandwichensis" is a misspelling.

Description

Distribution
This species is distributed in the Indian Ocean along Madagascar

References

 Dautzenberg, Ph. (1929). Mollusques testacés marins de Madagascar. Faune des Colonies Francaises, Tome III

Cystiscidae
Gastropods described in 1860